Pedro Pablo Nolet Canto (born 1 June 1970) is a retired Spanish athlete who competed in sprinting events. Her represented his country at three World Championships.

International competitions

Personal bests
Outdoor
100 metres – 10.35 (+1.8 m/s, Getafe 1993)
200 metres – 20.91 (+1.0 m/s, Salamanca 1993)
Indoor
60 metres – 6.71 (Madrid 1999)
200 metres – 21.51 (Valencia 1997)

References

1970 births
Living people
Spanish male sprinters
Sportspeople from Oviedo
Spanish people of Democratic Republic of the Congo descent
Spanish sportspeople of African descent
Mediterranean Games bronze medalists for Spain
Mediterranean Games medalists in athletics
Athletes (track and field) at the 1993 Mediterranean Games
Athletes (track and field) at the 2001 Mediterranean Games